Frank Emery Nix EM (22 April 1914 – 8 August 1996), was awarded the Edward Medal for the heroism he displayed on 18 April 1944, while working as a miner at Pilsley Colliery.

Early career
Frank Emery Nix was borm in Tibshelf, Derbyshire and at the age of 14 became a coal miner at Williamthorpe Colliery. While working down the mine Nix attended Mansfield Technical College and obtained an Overman's Certificate. Having spent time at Tibshelf Botton pit he moved Pilsley Colliery in 1939 becoming a Pit Deputy.

Citation

Nix was awarded the Edward Medal for his action after an accident underground:

"On the 18th April at 4.30 a.m. a "Bump" occurred at the coal face on which Mr. Ernest Vickers and a workmate were cutting coal with a compressed air machine, as a result of which the flamper over the bars from the left side end of the machine was broken for a distance of 35 yards, the roof lowering about 8 inches. The bar over Mr. Vickers lowered under the weight of the flamper and pinned his head against the edge of the conveyor pans. Mr. Vickers shouted and signalled by knocking on the pans, and his workmate stopped the machine, and, as he was unable to pass the machine to go to Mr. Vickers' assistance, shouted to Mr. Nix and then went round the roadways about 2,500 yards with another man to give what help he could. Mr. Nix had three men with him behind the machine, two of whom slid down the pans and placed a prop in order to take the weight off Mr. Vickers' head. Mr. Nix followed them down but, seeing that nearly all the props within ten yards of the accident were broken, sent them back and himself went along to where Mr. Vickers was trapped. With the aid of the third man Mr. Nix worked his way down the face side, resetting broken props as necessary. By this time the roof had lowered to about 15 inches from the floor, and this was consequently a most difficult job. The setting of about 12 props brought Mr. Nix to a position about three yards from Mr. Vickers, but owing to the fall of earth he was unable to see him. He went back to the machine to ascertain the position and then returned and began to clear away the earth with the assistance of one of the men. After Mr. Vickers was exposed, it became obvious that the only way to liberate him without a further fall was to lighten the bar, and this he did by breaking the flamper with a hammer, working most carefully for fear of a further fall which would have involved not only Mr. Vickers and himself but two of the other men as well. When the bar was sufficiently uncovered, Mr. Nix sawed off the end and liberated Mr. Vickers, who fortunately was suffering only from severe shock and bruises. The whole operation took about two hours during which Mr. Nix was working in a height of about 15 inches under a broken and detached roof, the confined space offering little chance if a further fall had occurred." 
 
Nix was awarded the Edward Medal for his bravery. His award was announced in the London Gazette on 21 November 1944.

Later life

Nix continued to work at Pilsley Colliery until it closed in 1957. He then worked as a Deputy with the National Coal Board, at various pits until his retirement in 1979.

He died on 8 August 1996 in Chesterfield.

George Cross

The Edward Medal was discontinued in 1971, when surviving recipients of the Edward Medal (along with holders of the Albert Medal) were invited to exchange their award for the George Cross. Nine elected not to exchange their medals including Nix.

References

British recipients of the George Cross
1914 births
1996 deaths